The list of ship launches in 1917 includes a chronological list of some ships launched in 1917.



References

Sources

1917
1917 in transport